The fourth series of the television series Top Gear Australia aired in Australia from 30 August 2011 until 28 April 2012, consisting of six episodes. The presenting line-up featured Steve Pizzati, Shane Jacobson, Ewen Page and The Stig.

This would be the last series of Top Gear as it was cancelled in 2012 due to declining ratings of the last two series.

Episodes
{| class="wikitable plainrowheaders"
|-
! scope="col" style="background:#FFF231;" | Total
! scope="col" style="background:#FFF231;" | No.
! scope="col" style="background:#FFF231;" | Title
! scope="col" style="background:#FFF231;" | Reviews
! scope="col" style="background:#FFF231;" | Challenge
! scope="col" style="background:#FFF231;" | Guest
! scope="col" style="background:#FFF231;" | Original airdate
|-

|}

External links
Official site
 
Top Gear Australia magazine site
Top Gear Australia Test Track

2011 Australian television seasons
Top Gear Australia